"Acquainted with the Night" is a poem by Robert Frost. It first appeared in the Autumn, 1928 issue of The Virginia Quarterly Review and was republished that year in his collection West-Running Brook.

Poem

Interpretation and form
The poem is most often read as the poet/narrator's admission of having experienced depression and a vivid description of what that experience feels like. In this particular reading of the poem, "the night" is the depression itself, and the narrator describes how he views the world around him in this state of mind. Although he is in a city, he feels completely isolated from everything around him.

The poem is written in strict iambic pentameter, with 14 lines like a sonnet, and with a terza rima ("third rhyme") rhyme scheme, which follows the complex pattern of: aba bcb cdc dad aa. Terza rima was invented by the Italian poet Dante Alighieri for his epic poem The Divine Comedy. Because Italian is a language in which many words have vowel endings, terza rima is much less difficult to write in Italian than it is in English. Because of its difficulty, very few writers in English have attempted the form. However, Frost was a master of many forms, and "Acquainted with the Night" is one of the most famous examples of an American poem written in terza rima.

Publication history
The poem first appeared in the Autumn, 1928 issue of The Virginia Quarterly Review edited by James Southall Wilson. It was republished that year by Henry Holt and Company in the poetry collection West-Running Brook.

References

Sources
Nancy Lewis Tuten; John Zubizarreta (2001). The Robert Frost Encyclopedia. Greenwood Publishing Group. ISBN 978-0-313-29464-8.
Jay Parini (2000). Robert Frost: A Life. Macmillan. ISBN 978-0-8050-6341-7.
Jeffrey Meyers (1996). Robert Frost: A Biography. Houghton Mifflin. ISBN 9780395856031.

External links

 Text of the poem
 Excerpt from a close reading of "Acquainted with the Night"

Poetry by Robert Frost
1928 poems
Works originally published in American magazines
Works originally published in literary magazines
Modernist poems
American poems
Poems in terza rima